Echinenone is a xanthophyll, with formula C40H54O. It is found in some cyanobacteria. It is synthesized from β-carotene by the enzyme beta-carotene ketolase (or CrtW). It has also been isolated from sea urchins.

References

Carotenoids
Cyanobacteria
Echinoidea
Cyclohexenes